Anaxita sannionis is a moth of the family Erebidae. It is found in Peru.

References

Moths described in 1873
Phaegopterina
Moths of South America